Yeşilbahçe can refer to:

 Yeşilbahçe, Ceyhan
 Yeşilbahçe, Silvan